Wang Shixin (Chinese: 王世鑫, born 9 January 1993) is a Chinese football player, who plays for Xinjiang Tianshan Leopard in the China League One.

Club career
Wang Shixin started his professional football career in 2011 when he was promoted to Chinese Super League side Dalian Shide.  On 1 July 2012, he made his debut for Dalian Shide in the 2012 Chinese Super League against Guizhou Renhe, coming on as a substitute for Jiang Jihong in the 79th minute. He made 6 league appearances in the 2012 league season.

In 2013, Wang transferred to Dalian Aerbin after Dalian Shide dissolved. On 1 March 2013，he moved to China League One side Shenyang Shenbei on a one-year loan deal.

Career statistics
Statistics accurate as of match played 31 December 2020.

References

External links

1993 births
Living people
Chinese footballers
Footballers from Dalian
Dalian Shide F.C. players
Dalian Professional F.C. players
Chinese Super League players
China League One players
Association football midfielders